Oleksandr Volkov may refer to:

 Alexander Volkov (basketball)
 Oleksandr Volkov (footballer, born 1961)
 Oleksandr Volkov (footballer, born 1989)